The Omni Directional Vehicle (ODV) is a ground support utility vehicle manufactured by Hammonds Technical Services Inc. in Houston, Texas.  The ODV can perform a variety of jobs, including towing aircraft and plowing snow.  The largest variant, the G-90, can tow up to 90,000 pounds.  The ODV's main advantage over other utility vehicles is its zero degree turning radius, which allows it to turn in any direction from a fixed point.  This allows the ODV to operate in confined spaces by eliminating the need to turn the vehicle in a large arc. The driver can also tow in any direction without having to look over their shoulder.  The ODV is a round vehicle with a rotary hitch mounted on its outer ring to allow the driver to quickly make adjustments or to switch between pushing or pulling.  The vehicle turns by engaging either of its two drive wheels.

History and development
The ODV began development in the late 1990s, and was slated to enter the commercial ground support equipment market in 2001, but the 9/11 Terrorist Attacks lowered demand for new ground support vehicles as airlines cut costs. Since then, Boeing has purchased several ODV's for its 787 Dreamliner project. The United States Air Force has also procured ODVs for use at Robins Air Force Base

Variants
The ODV comes in four general models, the G-18, G-30, G-60 and G-90.  Each vehicle can be fitted with attachments that convert the ODV into a tow bar tractor, a towbarless tractor (the ODAT), snow plow, or rotary broom.

In popular culture
The ODV appeared in the 2009 film Star Trek (film) as one of the loading vehicles at Starfleet Academy.

See also 
MB-2 Tow Tractor
M2 High Speed Tractor
U-30 Tow Tractor

References

External links
  Official website of the ODV
 Promotional video showing the ODV's capabilities

Land vehicles
Aircraft ground handling
Aviation ground support equipment
Snow removal
Equipment of the United States Air Force